Ukrainian singer Svetlana Loboda (Loboda) has released three studio albums, one extended play (EP), one compilation album, one live album, three remix albums, fifty-three singles, and thirty-eight music videos.

Albums

Studio albums

Live albums

Extended plays

Remix albums

Compilations

Singles

Music videos

References

External links
 
 
 
 

Discographies of Ukrainian artists
Pop music discographies
Discography